Dow House may refer to the following buildings in the United States (by state then town):

Dow-Rosenzweig House, Denver, Colorado, listed on the National Register of Historic Places (NRHP) in northeast Denver
Dow House (Dow City, Iowa), listed on the NRHP in Crawford County
 Simon E. Dow House, listed as the "Dow House" on the NRHP in Crawford County, Iowa
 Neal S. Dow House in Portland, Maine, a National Historic Landmark and listed on the NRHP
Lenoir Dow House, Waltham, Massachusetts, listed on the NRHP in Middlesex County
Alden B. Dow House and Studio, Midland, Michigan, a National Historic Landmark and listed on the NRHP in Midland County
Herbert H. Dow House, Midland, Michigan, listed on the NRHP in Midland County
 Dow House (Mansfield, Ohio), listed on listed on the NRHP in Richland County
J.B. Dow House and Carpenter Douglas Barn, Beloit, Wisconsin, listed on the NRHP in Rock County 
John T. Dow House, Evansville, Wisconsin, listed on the NRHP in Rock County

See also
Dow Block, Stoneham, Massachusetts, listed on the NRHP in Middlesex County
Dow Hall (disambiguation)
Dower house, a house on a British estate for the use of the widow of the previous owner of the estate